The Gerrit Rietveld Academie, also known as Rietveld School of Art & Design and Rietveld Academy, is an art academy in Amsterdam, Netherlands. The academy was founded in 1924 and offers programs in fine arts and design.

History

In 1924, the Instituut voor Kunstnijverheidsonderwijs (Institute for Arts and Crafts Education) was founded by merging three art schools.

From 1939 to 1960, education was strongly influenced by the functionalist and socially critical ideas of De Stijl and the Bauhaus, partly due to the role of the socialist architect Mart Stam as director of education.

In 1966, the Rietveld Building designed by Gerrit Rietveld was completed. That year, the school was renamed to Gerrit Rietveld Academie, as a tribute to Gerrit Rietveld, who had died in 1964.

Since the 1960s and especially the 1970s, the role and influence of autonomous visual art and individual expression have grown in importance. These influences, combined with a practical focus and a critical mindset, still determine a significant part of the academy's image.

In 2003, the Benthem Crouwel Building designed by Benthem Crouwel Architects was completed.

In 2019, the Fedlev Building designed Paulien Bremmer of the Fedlev collective and Hootsmans Architects was completed.

Education

The Gerrit Rietveld Academy offers two bachelor's and five permanent master's programmes.
 Foundation year: the initial year of the Bachelor's education programme. In this first, formative year, a comprehensive art-theoretical framework is offered in combination with an intensive practical programme to introduce students into a broad range of media and techniques. During the foundation year, students also orient themselves in terms of the academy's various specializations, for which they enrol during the following year.
 Bachelor’s: Within the bachelor's program, it is possible to follow a Bachelor of Fine Arts or a Bachelor of Design. There are various specializations within these two programmes. After a general first year – the foundation year – students choose one of these graduation tracks. This is followed by three years of specialization. The Rietveld Academy also offers a part-time education, in which case the foundation year actually takes two years, followed by three years of specialization.
 Master’s: The master's programmes at the Rietveld Academy are housed within the Sandberg Institute. The five permanent departments at the Sandberg Institute are: Critical Studies, Design, Dirty Art Department, Fine Arts and Studio for Immediate Spaces. 
 Preparatory Training & Orientation Year: The Rietveld Academy offers several preparatory training courses for those who want to prepare to study at the Rietveld Academy: a preparatory training year and an orientation year. During the preparatory training year, a student follows lessons at the academy for 3.5 half-days a week. After completing the preparatory training year, it is possible to enrol directly in the foundation year. Another preparatory track for the Rietveld Academy is the orientation year, in which candidates attend classes at the academy for 30 Saturdays a year. After completion of this year, a candidate will still need to apply for admission before he or she can start the foundation year.
 Preparatory Training on Aruba: Starting on 10 October 2011, the Rietveld Academy will also be offering a preparatory training course on Aruba, which will focus mainly on the Caribbean and on the two American continents. This preparatory course, which lasts for 30 weeks, will be taught by various teachers from the Rietveld's Amsterdam school. This preparatory training year is a preparatory study track for the Gerrit Rietveld Academy's accredited bachelor's degree in Fine Arts and Design, which is scheduled to begin in 2012 on Aruba.

65,9 % of the student population comes from abroad, originating from over 60 different countries around the world. Most of the classes are in English. The Academy's highly conceptual and experimental approach is aimed at research-driven students who consistently strive to research new areas and push boundaries.

Particular specialisations are Inter-Architecture; Fine Arts; DesignLAB; Graphic Design; Fashion; Jewellery; TxT (Textiles); Image and Language; Photography; Glass; Ceramics; VAV; and DOGtime.

DOGtime, the Rietveld Academy's evening school, offers a two-year foundation programme. This is followed by a three-year degree track, with the choice of the following one of two directions: Autonomous Fine Art, or Interaction, Design, and Unstable Media (IDUM for short).

Expedition Academy 
Students who wish to be admitted to the Gerrit Rietveld Academy are expected to be receptive and self-reflective for the underlying purpose of discussing ideas and concepts.  The academy seeks to stimulate these qualities, hereby challenging students to question those aspects important to the individual. For the academy, traveling abroad is an essential facet of this personal development. Common travels engage students on an interpersonal level, as well as in relation to their environment.  This in effect becomes the motive for yielding a creative epiphany. Among other destinations, the academy has organized trips abroad in the past years to China, India, Iran, Nepal, Switzerland, Hungary, Spain, Italy, and Sweden.

Events 
Every year, the Rietveld Academy organizes a number of public events, including:
 Open Day (January): During the Open Day, all of the specialized departments highlight themselves through small exhibitions and other presentations. Teachers and students are present to talk about their departments, and to answer questions. The Open Day is a great opportunity to learn about what the education at the academy is like. The Open Day takes place every year on the last Friday of January.
 Rietveld in the Oude Kerk (January/February): In January, the Gerrit Rietveld Academy stages an annual exhibition with approximately 45 students from various departments, in Amsterdam's Oude Kerk.
 Graduation exhibition (July): Every year, the Rietveld Academy's students who are eligible for graduation present their work during the Rietveld's graduation exhibition. The academy is transformed into an exhibition space, and work can be seen from every department. The graduation exhibition attracts many visitors from outside the academy, including art gallery owners and art collectors. The graduation exhibition is held annually in early July.
 Rietveld UnCut (November): Much like the Open Day and the graduation exhibition, Rietveld UnCut is an occasion where the academy presents itself to outside world, in all its facets. Rietveld UnCut differs from the Open Day and the graduation exhibition in that it actively seeks to interact with the public. Since 2009, Rietveld UnCut has been organized by former students Tarja Szaraniec and Tomas Adolfs, in collaboration with the Flemish cultural centre De Brakke Grond. Under the supervision of guest director and visual artist Maze de Boer, students present their work to the outside world. Rietveld UnCut is held every year in November.

Affiliated organizations 
Public Rietveld 
Public Rietveld  is committed to ensuring the broadest possible interaction between the Gerrit Rietveld Academy and the outside world. That is why Public Rietveld is always looking for interesting forms of collaboration, both within the academy and outside. Its goal is to promote the presentation of the academy's students and teachers to the outside world. Public Rietveld consists of: communication and PR, internet communications, The Rietveld Society, student projects, TV Rietveld, and Radio Rietveld.

The Rietveld Society
The Rietveld Academie is very proud of the Rietveld alumni, and consequently would like to know how all alumni have been doing since graduation. That is why the academy would like to extend a warm invitation to all Rietveld alumni to become a member of the Alumni Network: The Rietveld Society. Through this network the Rietveld Academie hopes to keep in touch with the alumni and more importantly offer her alumni a platform to stay in touch with old Rietveld friends and other alumni.

Studium Generale
Studium Generale Rietveld Academy is a comprehensive trans-disciplinary theory programme focused on students and teachers from Gerrit Rietveld Academy's every single department, but is also accessible to the outside public. Every year, a number of curators are asked to invite guest speakers to address a specific theme. The goal of Studium Generale Rietveld Academy is to provide insight into how art and design are linked to other domains (from personal to political, from popular to academic) – the connections between our now and our past and future, and between our here and elsewhere. Based on the belief that you can only learn to think independently and critically if you dare to interconnect your knowledge, imagination, and reflection in unorthodox ways, every year Studium Generale Rietveld Academy embarks upon a new and exciting research project that is linked to the current discourse in a variety of ways.

 Professorship of Art and Public Space 
The Professorship of Art and Public Space at the Gerrit Rietveld Academy promotes research and theoretical reflection on the role of art and design in the public domain. It was created through collaboration between the Gerrit Rietveld Academy, the Sandberg Institute, the University of Amsterdam, the Foundation for Art and Public Space (SKOR), and the Virtual Museum Zuidas. Within the Rietveld Academy and the Sandberg Institute, the professorship supervises a so-called “knowledge circle”, in which research (conducted by teachers affiliated with the academy, as well as by outside experts in the field of art and public space) is coordinated and discussed. In connection with the research conducted in this context, educational projects emerge in which theoretical notions and reflections are further developed with groups of students. In addition, the professorship focuses on extending and strengthening the academy's theoretical education in general.

In Residence 
The Rietveld Research Residency (RRR) is a research opportunity for artists, created by the Gerrit Rietveld Academy in cooperation with, among others, the Fonds BKVB. The artists are given the opportunity to execute a clearly defined research project within a period of 1.5 to 3 years, as part of the educational framework of the Gerrit Rietveld Academy. Interaction with the academy's students and teachers forms an important part of their work.
In 2011, visual artist Henri Jacobs and philosopher Ann Meskens are filling this residency at the Gerrit Rietveld Academy.

Student life 
At the Rietveld Academy, activities and projects are also regularly organized for and by students. One example is Radio Rietveld, which is run entirely by students. Gerry Strawfield is the academy's student organization. Three times a year, Gerry Strawfield organizes a student party, including the Prom during the final exam period. The Gerry Strawfield Prom is often held at a special location; in 2009, for example, it was held at the Beurs van Berlage near Amsterdam's Dam Square.

Affiliated people

Notable teachers

 Fons Bemelmans
 Jan Elburg
 Martin Majoor
 Q.S. Serafijn
 Jan Sierhuis
 Henk Trumpie
 Gerard Unger
 Jan van der Vaart
 Sybren Valkema
 Henk van der Waal

Notable alumni 

 Frank Ammerlaan
 Marjan van Aubel
 Ben van Berkel
 Phil Bloom
 Jet Boeke
 Hans Bouman
 Peter te Bos
 Jan des Bouvrie
 Lita Cabellut
 Anna Carlgren
 Wim Crouwel
 Hans Deuss
 Robbert Dijkgraaf
 Rineke Dijkstra
 Iris Eichenberg
 Ger van Elk
 Rebecca Gomperts
 Antonio Jose Guzman
 Sibyl Heijnen
 Boudewijn Ietswaart
 Percy Irausquin
 Rachel de Joode
 Hans de Jong 
 Gerrit de Jager
 Peter Klashorst
 Marjon Keller
 Antonin Kratochvil
 Janne Kyttanen
 Maria Lalou
 Geert Lap
 Wietske van Leeuwen
 Ted van Lieshout
 Dana Lixenberg
 Johan van Loon
 Renzo Martens
 Hannie Mein
 Edgar Mosa
 Charlotte Mutsaers
 Barbara Nanning
 Ben Peters
 Gerard Prent
 Carla van de Puttelaar
 Willem de Rooij
 Julika Rudelius
 Wim T. Schippers
 Rob Scholte
 Henk Stallinga
 Jos Stam
 Umi Dachlan
 Gerard Unger
 Guido van der Werve
 Abdul Vas
 Thierry Veltman
 Giny Vos
 Alex van Warmerdam

References

External links

  Gerrit Rietveld Academie
 Sandberg Instituut

 
1924 establishments in the Netherlands
Art schools in the Netherlands
Educational institutions established in 1924
Vocational universities in the Netherlands